Lola Radivojević (born 2 January 2005) is a Serbian female tennis player.

Radivojević has won four singles titles and one doubles title on the ITF Circuit. On 7 November 2022, she reached her best singles ranking of world No. 349. On 24 October 2022, she peaked at No. 511 in the doubles rankings.

Early life and background
Radivojević was born in Prokuplje and started playing tennis at the age of 5 in her hometown of Blace. Two years later, she moved to Niš and trained at the local club and later was a member of the local tennis academy, while in 2019 she transferred to Novak Tennis Center in Belgrade.

Junior career
Radivojević made her junior Grand Slam debut at the 2021 French Open.

Junior Grand Slam performance
Singles:
 Australian Open: QF (2022)
 French Open: 1R (2021)
 Wimbledon: 1R (2021)
 US Open: –

Doubles:
 Australian Open: 1R (2022)
 French Open: 1R (2021)
 Wimbledon: 1R (2021)
 US Open: –

Senior career
Radivojević made her WTA Tour main-draw debut at the 2021 Serbia Open, where she was granted a wildcard entry into the main draw in both singles and doubles. She lost both of her matches in the first round – in singles, she was defeated by lucky loser Viktoriya Tomova, while in doubles, partnering compatriot Ivana Jorović, they lost to Dalila Jakupović and Yana Sizikova.

National representation
She earned her first Billie Jean King Cup nomination in April 2021 against Canada in the 2020–21 Play-offs for the 2022 Qualifying Round, but did not play in the tie. She played her first matches for Serbia Billie Jean King Cup team in April 2022 in Europe/Africa Zone Group I, while her lifetime win-loss record stands at 1–3.

ITF Circuit finals

Singles: 4 (4 titles)

Doubles: 1 (1 title)

ITF Junior Circuit finals

Singles: 4 (3 titles, 1 runner–up)

Doubles: 8 (3 titles, 5 runner–ups)

Notes

References

External links
 
 
 

2005 births
Living people
Serbian female tennis players
People from Prokuplje